was a minor feudal domain in Edo period Japan, located in Dewa Province (modern-day Yamagata Prefecture), Japan.  It was centered on Nagatoro Jin'ya in what is now part of the city of Higashine, Yamagata.

History
Nagatoro Domain was established by Yonekitsu Michimasa, daimyō of Kuki Domain in Musashi Province. The Yonekitsu territories were scattered across Musashi, Kazusa, Shimōsa, and Hitachi Provinces in addition to their small holding in Dewa. Yonekitsu Michimasa traded is 6400 koku in Musashi for lands in Murayama District of Dewa, and moved his seat from Kuri to Nagatoro in 1798.
The third and fourth daimyō, Yonekitsu Masayasu and Yonekitsu Masaaki, was born as the 10th and 11th sons of Sakai Tadakata of Shōnai Domain and was adopted into the clan.

The domain had a population of 2466 per the 1850 census and maintained its primary Edo residence (kamiyashiki) in Atago-shita.

During the Bakumatsu period, Yonekitsu Masaaki took the unusual step of arming and training 30 commoners in the domain as an auxiliary military force; however, the Boshin War bypassed the domain. After the Meiji restoration, in November 1869, Yonekitsu Masatoshi, the final daimyō, transferred his seat from Nagatoro to his estates in Kazusa, abolishing Nagatoro Domain and creating the new . After the abolition of the han system in July 1871, the Dewa territories of Ōami Domain was absorbed into Yamagata Prefecture.  Yonekitsu Masatoshi subsequently served in the Imperial Japanese Army as a member of the Imperial Guard and in 1884 was granted the title of viscount (shishaku) in the kazoku peerage.

Bakumatsu period holdings
Dewa Province (Uzen)
 4 villages in Murayama District
Shimōsa Province
4 villages in Toyoda District
1 village in Chiba District
1 village in Shimohabu District
Kazusa Province
2 villages in Nagara District
3 villages in Yamabe District
2 villages in Musha District

List of daimyō
  Yonekitsu clan (tozama) 1789-1869

Further reading

Notes

Domains of Japan
History of Yamagata Prefecture
1798 establishments in Japan
1869 disestablishments in Japan
States and territories disestablished in 1869
Dewa Province